Graceville is a suburb in the City of Brisbane, Queensland, Australia.

Geography 

The suburb is centred on Graceville railway station on the Ipswich railway line, and is predominantly residential, with houses generally being in the Queenslander style. The main roads in Graceville are Oxley Road, Graceville Avenue and Honour Avenue. The suburb also has a number of parks including Simpson's Playground, Graceville Memorial Park, and Faulkner Park.

History 
A Baptist chapel opened near the junction of Oxley Creek and the Brisbane River on Sunday 22 May 1864. It was on land donated by John and Thomas Strong (approx ). The Oxley Creek chapel was also used by other denominations, particularly the Presbyterians. It is unclear when the chapel closed but it is no longer extant.The suburb takes its name from its railway station, which in turn was named on 4 February 1875 by the Queensland Railways Department after Grace Grimes, the daughter of Samuel Grimes.

In 1879, the local government area of Yeerongpilly Division was created. In 1891, parts of Yeerongpilly Division were excised to create Sherwood Division becoming a Shire in 1903 which contained the suburb of Graceville. In 1925, the Shire of Sherwood was amalgamated into the City of Brisbane.

In December 1887, allotments in re-subdivisions 1 to 227 of subdivision 2 of portion 17, County of Stanley, Parish of Oxley, of "Graceville Park Estate" were advertised to be auctioned by R.J. Cottell, Auctioneer. A map advertising the auction states the estate includes Park Road, White Street, and Alfred Street. The classified advertisement for the auction states the estate is "only a stone's throw from the Railway Station and "is a splendid piece of ground, with a gentle slope to the river."

In December 1911, 207 allotments of the "Graceville Estate" were advertised to be auctioned by Currie, Buchanan & Co. Ltd. Auctioneers. A map advertising the auction states that the estate was "situated within easy walking distance of Graceville Railway Station". The classified advertisement for the auction states the estate had "Cool, invigorating breeze, every allotment ready to build on, right aspect, abundance of fresh air, charming views, exclusive neighbourhood."

In June 1926, 43 allotments of the "Greenfield Estate" were advertised to be auctioned by Charlton, Elliot and Sons. A map advertising the auction states that the estate was "within easy walking distance of Graceville Station". The classified advertisement for the auction states the estate was in "easy walking distance to station, good train service, water and electric light".

Graceville Baptist Church opened on Saturday 22 January 1927.

Graceville State School opened on 13 August 1928.

Graceville Uniting Church was opened in 1930. It was designed and built by local contractor Walter Taylor. It is a noted landmark in the suburb.

Christ the King Catholic Primary School opened on 25 January 1937 with an initial 60 students with four Presentation Sisters as teachers.

St Peter's Anglican Church was dedicated on 1 July 1956 by Venerable Frank Knight. Its last service was held on 27 February 1982. It was on Graceville Avenue (approx ).

The median age of the Graceville population was 37 years of age, the same as the national median. 77.1% of people living in Graceville were born in Australia, compared to the national average of 69.8%; the next most common countries of birth were England 4.4%, New Zealand 2.9%, United States of America 1.1%, Scotland 0.9%, South Africa 0.8%. 89.4% of people spoke only English at home; the next most popular languages were 0.8% Vietnamese, 0.7% Mandarin, 0.6% Polish, 0.5% German, 0.5% Cantonese.

Heritage listings 
Graceville has a number of heritage-listed sites, including:
 85 Bank Road: Beth-Eden
 95 Bank Road: Glenrae
 12 Churchill Street: Christ the King Roman Catholic Church (also known as St. Michael and the Holy Souls)
 161 Graceville Avenue: 161 Graceville Avenue Graceville (also known as Koorong)
 327 Honour Avenue: Central Buildings
 335 Honour Avenue: Concrete Block Residence
 17 Kew Road: 17 Kew Road Graceville (also known as Netherton)
 110 Long Street: Graceville railway station
 15 Magee Street: Brick War Service Home
 27 Magee Street: Brick War Service Home
 39 Magee Street: Brick War Service Home
 9 Molonga Terrace: Glengarry
 15 Molonga Terrace: The Gables
173 Oxley Road: Graceville Memorial Park
 215 Oxley Road: Graceville Uniting Church (formerly Graceville Methodist Church)
 8 Rakeevan Road: 8 Rakeevan Road, Graceville
 11 Rakeevan Road: Bulk store
 27 Strong Avenue: Brick War Service Home
 51 Strong Avenue: Brick War Service Home
 98 Strong Avenue: Anzac Cottage (also known as De Lesle)
 196 Verney Road East: Roslin Villa
 16 Young Street: Sherwood Scout Hall

Education 
Graceville State School is a government primary (Prep-6) school for boys and girls at 23 Acacia Avenue. In 2017, the school had an enrolment of 761 students with 58 teachers (44 full-time equivalent) and 18 non-teaching staff (14 full-time equivalent).

Christ the King School is a Catholic primary (Prep-6) school for boys and girls at 7 Randolph Street. In 2017, the school had an enrolment of 267 students with 23 teachers (16 full-time equivalent) and 15 non-teaching staff (8 full-time equivalent).

There are no secondary schools in Graceville; the nearest are in Corinda and Indooroopilly.

Amenities 
There are two shopping precincts in the suburb:

 Graceville Riverside Village at 158 Graceville Avenue.
 Graceville Fiveways, at the intersection of Oxley Avenue, Long Street East and Park Terrace.
Graceville Uniting Church is at 215 Oxley Road. It is part of the South Moreton Presbytery of the Uniting Church in Australia.

Graceville Memorial Oval, which has the Memorial for the soldiers who died in wars that lived in the area, and also serves as the home of both Western Suburbs Cricket Club and Wests Taylor Bridge Rugby Club.

Graceville has a number of sporting clubs, including

 Graceville Croquet Club in Memorial Park at Appel Street
 Souths Graceville Lions Rugby League Club
 South West United Hockey Club
 West Taylor Bridge Rugby Club
 Rangers Netball Club
 Western Suburbs Cricket Club
 Graceville Amateur Swimming Club, which is based at Graceville State School.

References

Further reading

External links

 
 
 

 
Suburbs of the City of Brisbane